In enzymology, a β-phosphoglucomutase is an enzyme that catalyzes the chemical reaction

β-D-glucose 1-phosphate  β-D-glucose 6-phosphate

Hence, this enzyme has one substrate, β-D-glucose 1-phosphate, and one product, β-D-glucose 6-phosphate.

This enzyme belongs to the family of isomerases, specifically the phosphotransferases (phosphomutases), which transfer phosphate groups within a molecule.  The systematic name of this enzyme class is beta-D-glucose 1,6-phosphomutase. This enzyme participates in starch and sucrose metabolism.

Structural studies

20 structures have been solved for this enzyme PDB. Most of these structures detail metal fluoride analogue complexes which are used to mimic different states along the reaction coordinate.

References

 
 

EC 5.4.2
Enzymes of known structure